Mohamed Benhadia (born 24 November 1981) is a retired Algerian athlete who specialized in the high jump. Earlier in his career he competed in the pole vault and the decathlon.

His personal best in the event is 2.22 metres from 2007.

Competition record

References

1981 births
Living people
Algerian male high jumpers
African Games medalists in athletics (track and field)
African Games bronze medalists for Algeria
Athletes (track and field) at the 2003 All-Africa Games
Athletes (track and field) at the 2007 All-Africa Games
21st-century Algerian people